The 1963 Singapore Open, also known as the 1963 Singapore Open Badminton Championships, took place from 26 – 28 July 1963 at the Singapore Badminton Hall in Singapore.

Venue
Singapore Badminton Hall

Final results

References 

Singapore Open (badminton)
1963 in badminton